Maloustyinskoye (Kese Iqtamaq) is a rural locality (a selo) and the administrative centre of Maloustyinsky Selsoviet, Mechetlinsky District, Bashkortostan, Russia. The population was 166 as of 2010. There are 9 streets.

Geography 
Maloustyinskoye is located 7 km northeast of Bolsheustyikinskoye (the district's administrative centre) by road. Nizhneye Bobino is the nearest rural locality.

References 

Rural localities in Mechetlinsky District